Quartet of Five is a 1949 East German drama film directed by Gerhard Lamprecht and starring Claus Holm, Yvonne Merin and Ruth Piepho.

The film's sets were designed by the art directors Artur Günther, Karl Schneider and Erich Zander.

Cast

References

External links

East German films
Films directed by Gerhard Lamprecht
1949 drama films
German drama films
German black-and-white films
1940s German-language films
1940s German films